The 1925–26 Lancashire Cup  was the eighteenth tournament in the history of this regional rugby league competition, and another new name was added to the trophy. This time it was the turn of Swinton, one of the founding members of the Northern Union, whose previous best had been as runners up to Oldham in 1910.

Background 
The number of teams entering this year's competition remained at 13 which resulted in 3 byes in the first round.

Competition and results

Round 1  
Involved  5 matches (with three byes) and 13 clubs

Round 2 – quarterfinals

Round 3 – semifinals

Final 
The final was due to be played on Saturday, 21 November 1925 but was postponed due to bad weather, in this case fog. The weather during that short period was atrocious and in fact Wigan had 5 matches postponed due to either a waterlogged pitch, a frozen pitch, fog or other bad weather in the four-week period from early November to early December.  The final was eventually played on Wednesday 9 December 1925 and Swinton beat Wigan by 15–11. The match was played at the Cliff, Broughton, Salford. The attendance was 15,000 and receipts £1,116.

Teams and scorers 

Scoring - Try = three (3) points - Goal = two (2) points - Drop goal = two (2) points

The road to success

See also 
1925–26 Northern Rugby Football League season

Notes 
 1 Match postponed due to fog
 2 The Cliff was the home ground of Broughton Rangers from 1913 and until they moved out to Belle Vue in 1933.

References

RFL Lancashire Cup
Lancashire Cup